Afghan TV is an Afghan commercial television station, based in its capital, Kabul. Launched on May 21, 2004, it is owned by Ahmed Shah Afghanzai, an Afghan entrepreneur. It originally broadcast for 18 hours daily, but has been broadcasting for full days since July 2004. The CEO of this Afghan TV channel is Mohammad Hamayoon Sepehr

Programs
Afghan TV has many entertainment programs, including sport, social and educational. It also has Indian, American, Korean and Arabic drama. It also broadcasts news, although this is also broadcast 24 hours a day on its sister channel, Afghan News.

2006 fining
In early 2006, the station was fined 50,000 AFN (Afghani) (approximately US$1,000) by the Afghan Supreme Court, after it had broadcast what the court called inappropriate images, including adult content.

The case was televised by Afghan TV and was covered extensively by other media outlets, however, the powerful clergy in the country succeeded in not only instating the fine on Afghan TV, but also severely restricting the ability of other television networks to broadcast entertainment.

Hotbird launch
On 15 June 2011, Afghan TV was launched in on the Hotbird 13°E satellite, meaning that the whole of Europe now can receive Afghan TV. Viewers in the Middle East can now receive Afghan TV on two satellites: Hotbird 13°E and Turksat 3A 42°E.

On 27 June 2011, the name 'Afghan TV' (on Hotbird) was suddenly renamed to 'boxelet.com'. It is unknown why this happened, even though the channel itself is Afghan TV and not Afghan News. Websites like KingOfSat state the channel as Afghan News TV and moved Afghan TV in the so-called channel cemetery.

On 1 July 2011, the channel started broadcasting in higher quality video on Hotbird, just like in Afghanistan.

Closure
On 23 December 2011, Afghan TV suddenly left Hotbird and ceased broadcasting on the satellite. They didn't put a notice on their website too. Viewers in west, north and central Europe are now unable to receive the channel. If you're in south or east Europe, you can still watch it via Express AM22. Also, central Europe viewers can get Express AM22 by a large and powerful satellite.

See also
 Television in Afghanistan

Television in Afghanistan
Mass media in Kabul